The 2014–15 Egyptian Second Division was the 35th edition of the Egyptian Second Division, the top Egyptian semi-professional level for football clubs, since its establishment in 1977. The season began on 18 September 2014 and concluded on 14 June 2015.

Aswan, El Entag El Harby and Ghazl El Mhalla won Promotion Group A, Group B and Group C respectively and secured the promotion to the 2015–16 Egyptian Premier League.

Teams

Group A

Group B

Group C

Group D

Group E

Group F

Standings

Group A

Group B

Group C

Group D

Group E

Group F

Promotion groups

Promotion Group A

Promotion Group B

Promotion Group C

References

Egyptian Second Division seasons
Egy
Egy
Second Division